HVAC (Heating, Ventilation and Air Conditioning) equipment needs a control system to regulate the operation of a heating and/or air conditioning system. Usually a sensing device is used to compare the actual state (e.g. temperature) with a target state. Then the control system draws a conclusion what action has to be taken (e.g. start the blower).

Direct digital control
Central controllers and most terminal unit controllers are programmable, meaning the direct digital control program code may be customized for the intended use. The program features include time schedules, set points, controllers, logic, timers, trend logs, and alarms. The unit controllers typically have analog and digital inputs that allow measurement of the variable (temperature, humidity, or pressure) and analog and digital outputs for control of the transport medium (hot/cold water and/or steam). Digital inputs are typically (dry) contacts from a control device, and analog inputs are typically a voltage or current measurement from a variable (temperature, humidity, velocity, or pressure) sensing device. Digital outputs are typically relay contacts used to start and stop equipment, and analog outputs are typically voltage or current signals to control the movement of the medium (air/water/steam) control devices such as valves, dampers, and motors.

Groups of DDC controllers, networked or not, form a layer of systems themselves. This "subsystem" is vital to the performance and basic operation of the overall HVAC system. The DDC system is the "brain" of the HVAC system. It dictates the position of every damper and valve in a system. It determines which fans, pumps, and chiller run and at what speed or capacity. With this configurable intelligence in this "brain", we are moving to the concept of building automation.

Building automation system
More complex HVAC systems can interface to Building Automation System (BAS) to allow the building owners to have more control over the heating or cooling units. The building owner can monitor the system and respond to alarms generated by the system from local or remote locations. The system can be scheduled for occupancy or the configuration can be changed from the BAS. Sometimes the BAS is directly controlling the HVAC components.
Depending on the BAS different interfaces can be used.

Today, there are also dedicated gateways that connect advanced VRV / VRF and Split HVAC Systems with Home Automation and BMS (Building Management Systems) controllers for centralized control and monitoring, obviating the need to purchase more complex and expensive HVAC systems. In addition, such gateway solutions are capable of providing remote control operation of all HVAC indoor units over the internet incorporating a simple and friendly user interface.

Cost and efficiency 
Many people do not have a Heating, Ventilation, and Air Condition (HVAC) system in their homes because it is too expensive. However according to this article Save Money Through Energy Efficiency, HVAC is not as expensive as one may think it is. This article Save Money Through Energy Efficiency tells us that the main thing to look for when shopping for a HVAC system is to make sure it runs efficiently. One thing to always look for when in the market of a new HVAC system is the energy guide sticker on the machine. Although many might choose to not believe that sticker and that it is just there to help with the sales, history shows that many of the newer HVAC systems with the yellow energy guide stickers help save customers hundreds to thousands of dollars depending on how much they use their HVAC system. On the yellow energy guide sticker on many of the newer systems, it displays the average cost to run that machine. Once a customer has found the perfect HVAC system, the customer should run it monthly if it is only put into use during specific times of year. It is recommended that if an HVAC system is not being used each month, that it should be turned on and left running for ten to fifteen minutes. On the other hand if the customer is somebody who runs their HVAC system frequently, it is really important to maintain it. Maintenance on an HVAC system includes changing out the air filter, inspecting the areas where air intake takes place, and check for leaks. Doing these three steps are super essential and is the key to keeping an HVAC system running for a long time. A customer should do these three steps every couple of months or when it is suspected problem with the HVAC system. Some signs that could lead to a potential problem is if the HVAC system does not provide air cool enough. That could be due to a leakage in the cooling fluids. Another sign that could mean that the HVAC system is not running perfectly fine is if there is a bad smell to the air that it is providing. That often means that the air filters need to be replaced. Changing the air filters on an HVAC system is really important because they are exposed to a lot of dust depending on where your HVAC system is and it could build up dust from simply just sitting in one's home.

Goals HVAC system installation 

Goal 1: Keep HVAC equipment and materials dry during construction and provide temperature and humidity control as required during the close-in phase of construction. HVAC System Installation 

Goal 2: Install HVAC systems to effectively implement moisture control as specified in the design drawings and specifications. HVAC System Installation 

Goal 3: Prepare operation and maintenance materials for continued performance of HVAC system moisture control.

Design, modeling, and marketing 
Most HVAC systems are used for the same purpose but designed differently. All HVAC systems have an intake, air filter, and air conditioning liquid. However, when designing HVAC systems, many engineers design it for a specific setting and/or purpose. When engineers are designing an HVAC system, they try their best to make it compact while still being able to perform at the highest level and experiment with different ways to make HVAC systems as efficient as possible. Even through all the hardships that come from designing a HVAC system, many Mechanical Engineers in particular have a passion for doing. Although it may be hard to get your sales after designing a new HVAC system, marketing the product is very important. The biggest concern that customers have when in the market looking for a new HVAC system is price and reliability.

History
The first HVAC controllers utilized  pneumatic controls since engineers understood fluid control. Thus, the properties of steam and air were used to control the flow of heated or cooled air via mechanically controlled logic.

After the control of air flow and temperature was standardized, the use of electromechanical relays in ladder logic to switch dampers became standardized. Eventually, the relays became electronic switches, as transistors eventually could handle greater current loads. By 1985, pneumatic controls could no longer compete with this new technology although pneumatic control systems (sometimes decades old) are still common in many older buildings.

By the year 2000, computerized controllers were common. Today, some of these controllers can even be accessed by web browsers, which need no longer be in the same building as the HVAC equipment. This allows some economies of scale, as a single operations center can easily monitor multiple buildings.

See also
American Society of Heating, Refrigerating and Air-Conditioning Engineers
BACnet
Building Automation
OpenTherm

References

Building automation
Heating, ventilation, and air conditioning